North West Leicestershire District Council elections are held every four years. North West Leicestershire District Council is the local authority for the non-metropolitan district of North West Leicestershire in Leicestershire, England. Since the last boundary changes in 2015, 38 councillors are elected from 38 wards.

Political control
The first election to the council was held in 1973, initially operating as a shadow authority before coming into its powers on 1 April 1974. Since 1973 political control of the council has been held by the following parties:

Following the 2019 election, the council's composition is:

Leadership
The leaders of the council since 2003 have been:

Elections and results

A dash indicates that the results for a particular election are not available, or that a party did not stand in an election.

District result maps

Ward details
Below is a summary of each ward in the District of North West Leicestershire. For each ward, a brief description is given along with a table showing its electoral history. In two or three member wards, the swings shown are based upon the average votes received by all candidates from a party.

Appleby
The Appleby ward covers several small, rural villages in the far south of the District. It has been represented by Richard Blunt since 2003; Blunt has also been the Leader of the Council since 2007. Like several of the District's geographically large rural wards, it is a safe seat for the Conservatives; it was, however, held by Labour for one term after their landslide victory in 1995.

Ashby Castle
The Ashby Castle ward is one of three wards that cover the Ashby-de-la-Zouch area. It has been represented by John Coxon since 2003. Geographically, it is the smallest of Ashby's wards and contains the 15th century Ashby Castle from which the ward takes its name. It is a very safe seat for the Conservatives who have consistently achieved a majority of between 40% and 50%, however, in 1995 they came in third place behind a Labour candidate and a victorious Independent.

Ashby Holywell
Another of Ashby-de-la-Zouch's three wards, the Ashby Holywell ward elects two councillors. It has been represented by two Conservatives, Roger Bayliss and Graham Allman, since 2003. This ward leans toward the Conservatives although it has been held by Labour in the past and saw a pro-Labour swing at the last election

Ashby Ivanhoe
The Ashby Ivanhoe ward is the last of Ashby-de-la-Zouch's three wards; it also elects two councillors. It has been represented by two Conservatives, James Hoult and Geraint Jones, since 2007. Ivanhoe is a key marginal ward between Labour and the Conservatives. It could be considered to be a bellwether ward because it has returned two councillors for the victorious party at every election.

Bardon
The Bardon ward is situated in the greater Coalville area and contains the headquarters of Bardon Aggregates as well as a large quarry managed by the company. It has been represented by Michael Specht since 2011. It has been consecutively held by the Conservatives since its creation in 2003, however, it is now a three-way marginal after the Conservatives, the Lib Dems and Labour received 33.4%, 31.2% and 27.6% respectively at the last election.

Ibstock and Heather
The Ibstock and Heather ward covers the village of Ibstock, which is situated approximately 2.5 miles south of Coalville, and the small village of Heather (pronounced HEE-ther); it elects three councillors. It has been represented by two Labour councillors and one Conservative since 2011. Three by-elections* have taken place in this ward since 2008; the first two of which, both in 2008, were narrowly won by Labour and the Conservatives respectively, despite a strong challenge from the BNP; the third was fairly comfortably won by Labour despite a good result for the Liberal Democrats. This ward has generally favoured Labour but has also elected Conservatives more recently.

Thringstone
The Thringstone ward covers the northwestern portion of Coalville and was formed after boundary changes in 2003. It has been represented by two Labour councillors since its creation. Thringstone is the safest Labour seat in the District as it is the only ward which has always returned Labour councillors; its predecessor, Holly Hayes, was also a very safe Labour seat.

By-elections

Overview

2019 - 2023

2015 - 2019

2011 - 2015

2007 - 2011

1999 - 2003

References

External links
North West Leicestershire District Council

 
Council elections in Leicestershire
North West Leicestershire